Tony Hwang (born September 17, 1964) is an American real estate agent and politician. A Republican, he is a member of the Connecticut State Senate, for the 28th District, which covers parts of Fairfield County. Previously, Hwang as a member of the Connecticut House of Representatives for the 134th District in the Connecticut General Assembly. Hwang became a state representative in 2008 and won re-election in 2010 and 2012. He was elected to the state Senate in 2014 and subsequently reelected. He is the assistant Senate Minority Leader.

Early life and education
Hwang was born in Kaohsiung, Taiwan after his parents fled the Communist government in mainland China as teenagers and re-settled in Taiwan. The family immigrated to the United States when Hwang was approximately nine years old and settled in Syracuse, New York.

Hwang received a bachelor's degree in Labor Relations and Organizational Behavior from Cornell University.

Political career

Elections
Hwang worked for United Technologies before becoming a licensed realtor in Fairfield. He was a member of the Town of Fairfield representative town meeting from 2003 to 2009 before being elected to the Connecticut House of Representatives from the 134th District. In 2014, Hwang won election to the Connecticut Senate from the 28th State Senate District, defeating the Democratic nominee, state Representative Kim Fawcett of the 133rd State House District. As of the 2021 Connecticut Redistricting Project, the district includes Fairfield, Easton, Newtown, and most of Bethel

Hwang was endorsed by State Senator John McKinney. McKinney vacated the Senate seat to run for governor, but subsequently lost in the Republican primary to Thomas C. Foley.

In 2016, Hwang received re-election endorsements from Robert H. Steele, John Kasich, the Connecticut League of Conservation Voters, and the National Federation of Independent Business. During the 2016 election, he retained his seat as state senator for the 28th district, winning with over 60% of the vote; and defeating Democratic nominee Philip Dwyer.

In 2018, Hwang defeated Democratic nominee Michelle McCabe with 52% of the vote; in a rematch in 2020, Hwang defeated McCabe a second time with 51.7% of the vote.

In 2022, Hwang will face off against Tim Gavin, a 28-year-old Yale graduate and Army Veteran who decided to run due to Hwang's stances on various forms of voting.

At various points since 2013, Hwang has publicly considered running for statewide office, and in 2017 had an exploratory committee for governor. Thus far, Hwang has opted not to run for statewide office.

Tenure and political positions
In 2019, the Connecticut League of Conservation Voters gave Hwang a "lifetime score" of 88% and called him "a thoughtful voice on the environment and conservation," citing his advocacy for the Long Island Sound Blue Plan and State Water Plan. The group endorsed Hwang's campaign for the state Senate in 2014. In 2019, he supported a plastic bag ban.

The Hartford Courant described Hwang in 2019 as a moderate Republican. During the 2016 Republican Party presidential primaries, Hwang supported John Kasich, and was named Connecticut state chairman of Kasich's campaign. He hosted campaign events with Kasich in the state. Hwang opposed Donald Trump and condemned Trump's insults targeting women, minorities, immigrants, and persons with disabilities; Hwang said in October 2016: "Trump's comments are unacceptable under any circumstances. It perpetuates the potential cycle of violence. I can't say it strong enough that I condemn them. I have never supported him because of those comments."

As of 2020, Hwang is the ranking member of the state Senate committees on housing, higher education, public safety and security, and transportation. Hwang was a member of the Legislative Environment Committee in 2011 and 2012.

Hwang voted against a pro-net neutrality bill in 2018, arguing that the matter is a federal issue. Like most Connecticut Republican legislators, Hwang opposes the legalization of marijuana; he opposed proposals in 2019 to legalize, tax, and regulate recreational marijuana in Connecticut. He is an outspoken opponent of legalized gambling in Connecticut, and has opposed moves to allow additional casinos and other gambling businesses to operate in the state. He has supported stronger gun control legislation.

Controversies

Campaign spending and advertisement controversies 
In 2014, the Connecticut State Elections Enforcement Commission investigated Hwang over an allegation of failure to disclose campaign purchases. The Commission authorized the investigation after reviewing complaints and submitted materials from Town of Fairfield's Democratic Town Committee. Hwang denied wrongdoing, and accused the Fairfield Democratic Town Committee as trying to distract the electorate.

In 2016, the State Elections Enforcement Commission fined Hwang $400 for violation of rules on campaign contribution limits.

Hwang spent $15,020 on advertising on place mats at a Connecticut restaurant chain. He purchased the ads with personal funds and was later reimbursed the cost by his political committee. Hwang initially did not disclose the reimbursement on his campaign disclosure filings. A local Democratic committee chairman filed an elections complaint against Hwang for the lapse in 2016. In December 2017, the state Elections Enforcement Commission ruled that the failure to disclosure was unintentional, and directed him to correct his filings.  In January 2017, Hwang also reported spending $2,850 on "Wikipedia information management" services.

In 2018, some of Hwang's campaign signs included copyrighted art from the nonprofit, nonpartisan organizations Hate Has No Home Here and Ben's Bells, without permission from the groups. After the use of the art was reported, Hwang issued an apology, said that the use was unintentional, and removed the signs and text at issue.

Public Argument With High School Girl

On Election Day in 2019, a high school student volunteer argued with Hwang at Fairfield's District 1 polling place about socialism. The exchange eventually got heated and brought the student to tears, prompting a Facebook post from her mother that circulated on social media. Hwang later apologized to the student, citing he did not intend to hurt the students feelings, rather educate her on the topic.

References

External links

1964 births
Living people
American people of Chinese descent
American politicians of Taiwanese descent
Cornell University School of Industrial and Labor Relations alumni
Republican Party members of the Connecticut House of Representatives
Politicians from Kaohsiung
Politicians from Syracuse, New York
Taiwanese emigrants to the United States
21st-century American politicians
Asian-American people in Connecticut politics
Asian conservatism in the United States